Canadian Forces Base Chatham or CFB Chatham was a Canadian Forces Base located immediately south of the town of Chatham, New Brunswick, Canada. Parts are now operating as Miramichi Municipal Airport since 1974 with a partial runway available (09/27 - asphalt).

From 1970 until 1985 Chatham had a Base Rescue Flight operating three CH-118 Iroquois helicopters. When the CF-101 Voodoo interceptors were retired, the CH-118s were redeployed to Base Flight Cold Lake.

Aerodrome Information
Three runways were listed as follows:

Squadrons

 1942 No. 113 (Bomber-Reconnaissance) Squadron - Lockheed Hudson
 1943 No. 119 (Bomber-Reconnaissance) Squadron - Lockheed Hudson
 1941-1942 No. 21 Elementary Flying Training School
 1941-1945 No. 10 Air Observer School
 1949-1950s - airbase with Canadair Sabre and de Havilland Vampire
 1949-1951 No. 421 Squadron RCAF 
 late 1950-1960s Golden Hawks - Canadair Sabres
 1962-1984 No. 416 Squadron RCAF - McDonnell CF-101 Voodoo and Base Rescue Flight - CH-118 Iroquois
 1984-1989 No. 434 Squadron RCAF - Canadair CF-5 and Base Rescue Flight - CH-118 Iroquois

References

External links
 New Brunswick Aviation Museum 

Canadian Forces bases in New Brunswick
Canadian Forces bases in Canada (closed)
Buildings and structures in Miramichi, New Brunswick
Transport in Miramichi, New Brunswick
Royal Canadian Air Force stations
Airports of the British Commonwealth Air Training Plan
Military airbases in New Brunswick
Military history of New Brunswick